White Flames is the first live album by English blues guitarist Snowy White and his band, The White Flames. It contains 12 songs, recorded on the 2006 White Flames UK tour.

Track listing 

 "I'll Be Moving On"
 "That Ain't Right"
 "What I'm Searching For"
 "Land Of Plenty"
 "Time Waits For No Man"
 "A Miracle I Need"
 "Wintersong"
 "The Emmerpeirissa Express"
 "Whiteflames Blues"
 "American Dream"
 "Long Grey Mare"
 "That's When I'll Stop Loving You"

Personnel 
Snowy White: All guitars, vocals.
Walter Latupeirissa: Bass guitar.
Max Middleton: Keyboards.
Juan van Emmerloot: Drums, percussion.

Snowy White albums
2007 live albums